Agathis montana, the Mount Panié kauri, is a species of conifer in the family Araucariaceae that is endemic to the higher elevations of Mont Panié in New Caledonia. 
The Latin specific epithet montana refers to mountains or coming from mountains.
Its native name is "Dayu Biik" in Nemi and Fwâi. It is a long-living species, with one recently dead tree of 80 m estimated to be 1,100–1,300 years old based on 14C dating. It is threatened by feral pigs, Phytophthora disease, bark beetles and climate change.

References

montana
Critically endangered plants
Endemic flora of New Caledonia
Taxonomy articles created by Polbot
Taxa named by David John de Laubenfels